Robert Nardella, Jr (born February 2, 1968) is an Italian-American former professional ice hockey defenseman who is currently an assistant coach with the Chicago Wolves of the American Hockey League (AHL).

Following his NCAA career with Ferris State University, Nardella competed in the Italian Hockey League, Deutsche Eishockey Liga, International Hockey League, and American Hockey League. During his career, he played for the Alleghe Hockey, Chicago Wolves, Adler Mannheim, Quad City Mallards, Milano Vipers, and Rockford IceHogs. Nardella spent the majority of his professional career playing with the Chicago Wolves, where he set a franchise record for most points by a defenseman with 298. He also helped them win the International Hockey League’s Turner Cup in 1998 and 2000 and the American Hockey League’s Calder Cup in 2002.

Nardella has represented Italy internationally at the 1998 Winter Olympics and 2006 Winter Olympics, as well as at the 1995, 1996, and 1997 Men's World Ice Hockey Championships.

Playing career
As a youth, Nardella played Minor ice hockey for the Chicago Jesters. Nardella later attended Holy Cross High School for two years before completing his junior and senior high school years in Iowa while playing with the Des Moines Buccaneers in the United States Hockey League. While with the Buccaneers, Nardella set a franchise record for most points scored in a season with 111 points during the 1987–88 season.

As a college walk-on for Ferris State University, Nardella played three seasons with the Bulldogs putting up 74	 points in 108 games. In his last season with the team, Nardella transitioned into a defensive position, on the encouragement of coach Bob Mancini, and had a breakout year, putting up 40 points in 42 games. While this was not enough to attract attention from National Hockey League scouts, he was recruited by Italian third division teams. Due to his grandfather's Italian nationality, Nardella qualified for those teams as a national member. Nardella joined the HC Alta Badia for the 1991-92 season. He was then moved to the top tier Italian Hockey League team, Alleghe Hockey, for the next two seasons.

Nardella then joined the Chicago Wolves for their inaugural season in the International Hockey League. During this time, Nardella competed in the 1995 Men's World Ice Hockey Championships. He was also later named to Italy's 1996, and 1997 Men's World Ice Hockey Championships roster. In 1998, Nardella was selected by the Team Italy for the 1998 Winter Olympics before returning to the Wolves.

Nardella won the 2000 Turner Cup Championship with the Wolves, while leading all defensemen with 13 points. As a result of his play, Nardella was named to the IHL Second All-Star Team. He re-signed with the Wolves after that season. Following the 2001 Turner Cup, the Chicago Wolves and five other IHL teams were absorbed into the American Hockey League. That season the Wolves won the 2002 Calder Cup, with Nardella accumulating 14 points. After six consecutive seasons with the Wolves spanning from 1997 until 2003, Nardella was released by the team on January 28, 2003, and he subsequently joined the Milano Vipers in Italy and played two games for the Quad City Mallards in the UHL. While with the Vipers, Nardella helped them win the Italian Elite League Championship by scoring nine points in 11 games. He re-joined the Wolves on March 17, 2004. Nardella ended his career with the Wolves as the franchise record holder for most points by a defensemen with 298 points.

While playing with the Rockford IceHogs in the 2005–06 season, Nardella was again selected to represent Italy at the 2006 Winter Olympics. He retired after that season on April 21, 2006.

Coaching career
In 2012, the Chicago Wolves hired Nardella to be the team's skills development coach. On December 15, 2012, Nardella was inducted into the Illinois Hockey Hall of Fame. In 2014, he became a part time coaching assistant until he was promoted to full time assistant coach in 2017.

Personal life
Although Nardella was born in the United States, due to his grandfather's Italian heritage he was able to represent Italy internationally. However, because Nardella played in Italy for a few seasons, he earned Italian citizenship.

While Nardella comes from a hockey involved family, he also encouraged his sons to become hockey players as well. His uncle Mike worked for the Chicago Blackhawks organization and his cousin Frank played NCAA hockey for Dartmouth College. While living in Rosemont with his wife Alicia, Nardella's elder son Bobby plays NCAA hockey for the University of Notre Dame and his younger son Nicholas played in the North American Hockey League.

Career statistics

Regular season and playoffs

International

Awards and honors

References

External links

1968 births
Living people
Ice hockey players at the 2006 Winter Olympics
Ice hockey players from Illinois
People from Melrose Park, Illinois
Des Moines Buccaneers players
Chicago Wolves players
Rockford IceHogs (UHL) players
Ferris State Bulldogs men's ice hockey players
Olympic ice hockey players of Italy
Quad City Mallards (UHL) players
American people of Italian descent
Ice hockey players at the 1998 Winter Olympics
American men's ice hockey defensemen